The following lists events that happened during 2000 in Chile.

Incumbents
President of Chile: Eduardo Frei Ruiz-Tagle (until 11 March), Ricardo Lagos (starting 11 March)

Events

January
16 January – Runoff elections are held.

Deaths
27 January – Óscar Olavarría (b. 1951)
30 April – Raúl Rettig (b. 1909)
14 July – Pepo (cartoonist) (b. 1911)
12 August – Luis Miqueles Caridi (b. 1911)

References 

 
Years of the 20th century in Chile
Chile